The 1964 Winter Olympics, officially known as the IX Olympic Winter Games, was a multi-sport event held in Innsbruck, Austria, from 29 January to 9 February. A total of 1,091 athletes from 36 nations participated in 34 events in 6 sports over 10 disciplines. India, Mongolia, and North Korea made their first Winter Olympics appearances; the latter achieved a 3,000 metres speed skating medal through Han Pil-hwa's silver medal tie with Valentina Stenina.

The Soviet Union broke the record for the most gold and total medals achieved at a single Winter Olympics, with 11 and 25 respectively. Russian athlete Lidiya Skoblikova won four gold medals, more medals than any other athlete.

Medal table

The medal table is based on information provided by the International Olympic Committee (IOC) and is consistent with IOC convention in its published medal tables. By default, the table is ordered by the number of gold medals the athletes from a nation have won, where nation is an entity represented by a National Olympic Committee (NOC). The number of silver medals is taken into consideration next and then the number of bronze medals.

References

External links
 
 
 

Medal table
1964
Austria sport-related lists